Nyctemera kala is a moth of the family Erebidae first described by Charles Swinhoe in 1892. It is found on the Key Islands of Indonesia.

References

Nyctemerina
Moths described in 1892